Crooked Run is a  long 1st order tributary to the Youghiogheny River in Fayette County, Pennsylvania.

Course
Crooked Run rises about 1 mile north-northeast of Stewarton, Pennsylvania, and then flows southwest to join the Youghiogheny River at Stewarton.

Watershed
Crooked Run drains  of area, receives about 46.1 in/year of precipitation, has a wetness index of 385.09, and is about 42% forested.

References

Tributaries of the Youghiogheny River
Rivers of Pennsylvania
Rivers of Fayette County, Pennsylvania
Allegheny Plateau